Rohan Blizard (born 20 May 1984) is an Australian professional golfer, who currently plays on the Asian Tour.

Blizard was born in New South Wales and plays golf at New South Wales Golf Club.

Blizard was a member of the Golf Australia National Squad before turning pro at the end of 2008. The highlight of his amateur career came in March 2007 when he claimed the Australian Amateur at his home course. He used local knowledge to his advantage, progressing to the final where he defeated fellow New South Welshman Justin Roach 3 & 2.

His career highlight came in 2011 when he claimed the John Hughes Geely Nexus Risk Services Western Australia Open Championship, shooting a 5-under-par 67 in the final round for a 10-under-par total. This was a two stroke victory over Ashley Hall, David McKenzie and Matt Jager.

Amateur wins
2007 Australian Amateur, SBS Invitational
2008 New South Wales Medal, East of Scotland Open Amateur

Professional wins (3)

PGA Tour of Australasia wins (1)

PGA Tour of Australasia playoff record (0–1)

PGA Tour China wins (1)

Other wins (1)
2007 Tasmanian Open (as an amateur)

Results in major championships

Note: Blizard only played in The Open Championship.
CUT = missed the half-way cut

Team appearances
Amateur
Nomura Cup (representing Australia): 2007 (winners)
Eisenhower Trophy (representing Australia): 2008
Bonallack Trophy (representing Asia/Pacific): 2008
Australian Men's Interstate Teams Matches (representing New South Wales): 2005 (winners), 2006 (winners), 2007 (winners), 2008

External links

Profile on the Golf Australia website

Australian male golfers
Asian Tour golfers
1984 births
Living people